Black Snake Moan is a 2006 American film written and directed by Craig Brewer and starring Samuel L. Jackson, Christina Ricci, and Justin Timberlake. The film focuses on a Mississippi bluesman who holds a troubled local woman captive in his house in an attempt to cure her of nymphomania after finding her severely beaten on the side of a road. The title of the film derives from the 1927 Blind Lemon Jefferson song. The film draws numerous references to the Mississippi Blues movement, particularly in its title and soundtrack. Black Snake Moan garnered mixed to positive reviews from critics, and was a box-office bomb, grossing only $10.9 million against a $15 million budget.

Plot
The film centers on two main characters: Lazarus Redd, a deeply religious farmer and former blues guitarist, and Rae Doole, a young sex addict. Lazarus' wife and his brother were having an affair, which has left him bitter and angry. Rae's boyfriend Ronnie Morgan leaves for deployment with the 196th Field Artillery Brigade, Tennessee National Guard, and in his absence, she indulges in bouts of promiscuity and drug use. During one of Rae's binges, Ronnie's friend Gill Morton tries to take advantage of her. She laughs at his advances, comparing him unfavorably with another man, and he severely beats her. Believing she's dead, Gill dumps Rae and leaves her by the side of the road wearing only a shirt and underwear and drives away.

Lazarus discovers Rae unconscious next to the road the next morning and brings her home to nurse her back to health. Lazarus goes to see Tehronne – the man who Lazarus thought had beaten her – and learns of her promiscuity. Over the course of several days, Rae, delirious with fever, occasionally wakes up and tries to flee from Lazarus. He chains her to the radiator to keep her from running away. After Rae regains her wits, Lazarus announces that it is his spiritual duty to heal her of her sinful ways and refuses to release her until he does so. Rae makes several attempts to escape, and even briefly has sex with a teenager who helps out on Lazarus' farm.

She eventually comes to tolerate her position. Lazarus buys her a conservative dress to wear, plays the guitar for her, and feeds her home-cooked meals. Lazarus' pastor and close friend, R.L., visits Lazarus at his house and discovers that Lazarus is imprisoning Rae. The pastor tries to reason with Lazarus and the group shares a meal.

Meanwhile, Ronnie returns to town after being discharged from the National Guard due to his severe anxiety disorder. While searching for Rae, who has disappeared, he meets Gill, who informs him that Rae cheats on him whenever he is out of town. Ronnie attacks Gill, steals his truck, and continues searching for Rae.

In the morning, Lazarus frees Rae, having decided that he has no authority to pass judgment on her. Rae chooses to stay with Lazarus of her own will. That night during a thunderstorm, at Rae's request, Lazarus sings a song for her, "Black Snake Moan" by Blind Lemon Jefferson. Later, Rae and Lazarus take a trip into town, where Rae confronts her mother about the sexual abuse she suffered at the hands of her mother's partner. Meanwhile, Lazarus has formed a budding romance with the local pharmacist, Angela. He plays a blues concert at a local bar, which Rae attends. Ronnie spots Rae and follows her to Lazarus' house. He confronts the pair with a pistol, but Lazarus talks him down and summons the pastor. Ronnie and Rae decide they are stronger together than apart and get married. While driving away, Ronnie suffers from a panic attack again and Rae begins to have one of her spells, but then they pull themselves together, and resolve to take care of each other.

Cast

 Samuel L. Jackson as Lazarus Redd
 Christina Ricci as Rae Doole
 Justin Timberlake as Ronnie Morgan
 John Cothran Jr. as R.L.
 S. Epatha Merkerson as Angela
 David Banner as Tehronne
 Kim Richards as Sandy Doole
 Son House (archive footage) as Himself
 Neimus K. Williams as Lincoln James
 Michael Raymond-James as Gill Morton
 Adriane Lenox as Rose Woods
 Leonard L. Thomas as Deke Woods
 Jeff Pope as Batson
 Amy LaVere as Jesse
 Clare Grant as Kell
 Charles "Skip" Pitts as Charlie

Production
For the film, Jackson spent six or seven hours a day for half a year learning how to play the blues guitar for several songs he plays throughout the film. Ricci wore an actual  chain during filming and ate only foods of no nutritional value to achieve a sickly appearance.  She told Entertainment Weekly that she remained scantily clad even when the cameras were not rolling: "Sam [Jackson] would be like, 'Put some clothes on!' I was like, 'No, you don't understand. I'm doing something important.'"

Christina Ricci said the rough sex scenes were painful, partly because one of her fellow cast members, rap producer David Banner, had no previous acting experience. In one scene with Banner, Ricci said: "I was being hurt. It kind of felt like being raped. It was hard. I felt terrible, but it wasn't Dave's fault at all."

Reception

Critical response
The website's critical consensus reads, "Uninhibited performances, skillful direction, and a killer blues soundtrack elevate Black Snake Moan beyond its outlandish premise." On Metacritic, the film has an average score of 52 out of 100, based on 34 critics, indicating "mixed or average reviews".

On the television program Ebert & Roeper, filmmaker Kevin Smith, filling in for Roger Ebert, described the film as the best of the year thus far. Smith praised Ricci and Jackson, saying this was Ricci's best performance and Jackson's best performance since Pulp Fiction (1994). Richard Roeper also gave the film a "thumb up" rating. Matt Glasby of Film4, however, awarded the film only 1 star out of 5, calling it a "pressure-cooked mess" that was "bad enough to make gums bleed".

Rolling Stones Peter Travers declared the film the year's Worst Soft-Core Sex on his list of the Worst Movies of 2007.

Box office
 
During its March 2–4, 2007 opening weekend in the US the film earned $4 million, putting it in eighth place behind films including other new releases Wild Hogs and Zodiac.

Marketing
In April 2008, Ricci commented on the promotional poster for the film, criticizing it as exploitative of women:

Feministing criticized the film's marketing for its portrayal of sexualized violence.

Soundtrack

Black Snake Moan was released January 30, 2007 by New West Records featuring various artists including four tracks performed by Jackson himself. The 17 tracks cover classic to modern blues.

Critical reviews
Glenn Gaslin at Moving Pictures Magazine briefly reviewed and praised the album: "It should make anyone who loves the blues, er, happy." Chad Grischow at IGN reviewed the album at length, concluding with, "The album does an excellent job at capturing the sweaty underbelly of the southern blues scene, and is a recommended listen, even if not for the reasons you originally picked it up."

On February 16, 2007, Sarah Linn of Sound the Sirens Magazine wrote in her final paragraph,

James B. Eldred at Bullz-Eye.com concluded his favorable review with,

Notes

References
General sources:
 Blackfilm.com, June 2005:  BLACK SNAKE MOAN preview: An Interview with Director Craig Brewer (cited 2 September 2006)
 Yahoo Movies, Black Snake Moan (cited 2 September 2006)
 Black Snake Moan at Real Movie News (cited 29 November 2006)

External links

 
 
 
 

2006 films
2006 black comedy films
2006 comedy-drama films
2000s English-language films
American black comedy films
American comedy-drama films
Blues films
Films about dysfunctional families
Films about music and musicians
Films about sex addiction
Films directed by Craig Brewer
Films scored by Scott Bomar
Films set in Memphis, Tennessee
Films shot in Tennessee
Films with screenplays by Craig Brewer
Paramount Vantage films
Southern Gothic films
2000s American films
African-American films